Ribbeck is a German surname. Notable people with the surname include:

Erich Ribbeck (born 1937), German football player and manager
Otto Ribbeck (1827–1898), German classical scholar
Katharina Ribbeck, German-American biologist

See also
 Herr von Ribbeck auf Ribbeck im Havelland, German poem

German-language surnames